Alqchin Rural District is a rural district (dehestan) in the Central District of Charam County, Kohgiluyeh and Boyer-Ahmad Province, Iran. At the 2006 census, its population was 5,775, in 1,105 families. The rural district has 17 villages.

References 

Rural Districts of Kohgiluyeh and Boyer-Ahmad Province
Charam County